Aljoscha Pause is a German filmmaker, director, TV journalist, writer and producer. He is a member of the Deutsche Filmakademie and the German Academy for Football Culture.

Childhood, education and early career 
Aljoscha Pause grew up in Bonn. After completing high school he studied Romance philology at Rheinische Friedrich-Wilhelms University in Bonn. He received training as a narrator at Deutsche Welle between 1998 and 2002. Pause, his wife and two daughters live in Bonn.
During his school and college years, a worked at the cabaret theater "Pantheon" of his father Rainer Pause, while also working as a reporter for a local city magazine and a private radio broadcaster (Radio Bonn/Rhein-Sieg).
At the age of 24 he began a career in television, initially from 1996 to 1999 as a sports reporter at German Sports Television (now called Sport1) and later from 1999 to 2003 at the main sports desk of Kirch Media Group, Sat.1 (with the flagship program "Ran") and Premiere, where he worked as a filmmaker, presenter, commentator and field reporter. From 2009 to 2011 Aljoscha Pause also served as a reporter for the Bundesliga broadcaster of Deutsche Telekom, "LIGA total!"

Cinematic works 
Pause has worked as a self-employed producer and filmmaker since 2003, focusing on longer documentary films. His film projects often deal with socio-political aspects of sports (e.g. homophobia in football, hooligans, alcohol consumption and football, the German Football League for the Blind). An additional topic of emphasis is personal portraits, mostly about football players but also about actor Michael Jäger (an ex-hooligan who for ten years played a role on the early-evening soap opera "Marienhof"). His first full-length cinematic releases were two well-received, long-term documentaries, "Tom meets Zizou" (2011) and "Trainer!" (2013). Pause has received numerous prizes and awards for his work, including the leading television award in Germany, the Grimme Prize (2010, for "Breaking the taboo").

Trilogy – Homophobia in Football (2008–2011) 
Produced in 2008 for DSF, "The Great Taboo – Homosexuality and Football" was an "honest, dispassionate stock-taking" of the conditions facing homosexual soccer athletes in Germany. lt was the first extensive TV documentary to deal with the topic, and for this reason was honored by the Association of Lesbian and Gay Journalists (Bund Lesbischer und Schwuler Journalistlnnen, BLSJ) with the 2008 Felix Rexhausen Prize. (Statement by the panel of judges: "Outstandingly researched and with a broad scope, this is an immensely enlightening report [...] lt shows the entire spectrum – from the fans in the stadiums to lesbian ex-professionals such as Tanja Walther and Anouschka Bernhard and the transsexual referee Marie Karsten. Spectacular is the misguided statement by Cologne coach Christoph Daum, which made national headlines. The 45-minute documentary is as informative as it is sober, and subtly reveals how widespread anti-gay feeling is in the world of football – on every level."

In the second part of the trilogy "Breaking the Taboo – The New Progress of Homosexuality in Football" (2009), Pause devotes another 12 months to the topic and films ongoing developments. According to the Süddeutsche Zeitung newspaper, "Pause has bequeathed a journalistic exclamation mark to the private broadcasting company DSF. He lives up to the expectations that the big publicly funded broadcasters have as yet failed to fulfill in even the most perfunctory way." One year after his first documentary, he investigates whether there were indeed any actual developments in the German Football Association and league following the "initial spark" and discussion in 2008. For this film, Pause received the 2010 "Alternative Media Prize" and the Grimme Prize in the category Information & Culture/Special.
	
Following the productions of "The Great Taboo – Homosexuality and Football" (2008) and "Breaking the Taboo – The New Progress of Homosexuality in Football" (2009), Pause returned in March 2011 with the third part of his trilogy on the subject of "Homosexuality in Football" with a documentary for Sport 1 called "Football ls Everything - Even Gay" in which he asks just how difficult it really is to make long-term attitude changes about a taboo topic. The filmmaker monitored developments over 18 months to prepare this documentary.

All three films were created in cooperation with the "German Academy for Football Culture".

Tom Meets Zizou (2011) 

Aljoscha Pause spent eight years working on this long-term documentary about former professional Bundesliga athlete Thomas Broich. The film traces Broich's career in the Bundesliga, which began auspiciously but ended following numerous athletic and personal setbacks and disappointments with a transfer to Australian club Brisbane Roar in 2010.

The result of some 40 meetings and interviews over eight years, the 135-minute cinema documentary entitled "Tom meets Zizou – Not a Midsummer Night's Dream" debuted as the opening film of the 8th International Football Film Festival 11mm in Berlin on 25 March 2011. The state-run rating authority German Film and Media Evaluation (Deutsche Film- und Medienbewertung, formerly FiImbewertungssteIIe Wiesbaden rated the film as "especially worthwhile". lt was distributed nationwide by mindjazz pictures with an opening date of 28 July 2011. The project enjoyed the support of the DFB Cultural Foundation.

The film was released on DVD and Blu-ray in late 2011 and was screened at international festivals including the International Young Audience Film Festival  in Posen, the Thinking Football Film Festival  in Bilbao, The ClNEfoot Festival in Rio de Janeiro and the Flutlicht Film Festival in Basel (on 1 February 2014 in a double feature with "TRAINER!" on the topic of Failure). "Tom meets Zizou" has been translated into English, Polish, Spanish and Portuguese. German broadcaster WDR showed a 90-minute TV version on 21 August 2012, and the film was awarded the 2012 VDS Television Prize. ln addition, it was nominated by the 11mm Football Film Festival for the award "Best Football Film of All Time".

Mesut, 17 (2013) 
The short film "Mesut, 17" was premiered at the 11mm Film Festival in Berlin in March, 2013. The nine-and-a-half-minute film about Mesut Özil, who was 17 at the time, was made from footage (some of it never before used) recorded for a broadcast report about a youth soccer tournament that Pause produced in early 2006. ln addition to Özil himself, who gave his first-ever TV interview, the film also features a statement by Joachim Löw, who at the time was assistant to Jürgen Klinsmann.

Originally intended solely for use at the 10th anniversary of the 11mm Football Film Festival, the film made such a good impression on Mesut Özil that he posted it to his Facebook page which now boasts more than 20 million fans. Due to the subsequent widespread reporting in the media and the more than one million hits it received on YouTube alone, the film became an Internet phenomenon that was reported on in the main evening news on RTL.

Trainer! (2013) 
Released in early June 2013, "Trainer!" is Pause's second full-length documentary film, for which the filmmaker observed three young professional coaches (Frank Schmidt, André Schubert, Stephan Schmidt) over the course of a football season.

The film also takes a look behind the scenes at the football teachers' training program of the German Football Association (DFB) led by Frank Wormuth. Established coaches like Jürgen Klopp, Hans Meyer, Armin Veh, Mirko Slomka, Peter Neururer, Thomas Schaaf and Michael Oenning also provide extensive insights.

Altogether, Pause spent six months researching and one year filming and editing. The film is a Pausefilm production commissioned by WDR (editor WDR: Steffen Simon). The television premiere of the 90-minute cut was broadcast on WDR on 3 June 2013, and the theater premiere of the 138-minute "director's cut" premiered on 11 June at the Babylon cinema in Berlin-Mitte. The film then toured Germany with the support of the DFB Cultural Foundation and distributor mindjazz pictures, garnering enthusiastic praise from the press.

The film was released on DVD and Blu-ray on June 28, 2013. ln early 2014 Pause received the VDS Television Prize, having already-been nominated for the 2014 Adolf Grimme Prize. "Trainer!" will be featured at the 2014 Flutlicht Film Festival in Basel and at the Joga Bonito! Festival in Vienna.

Film productions (excerpts) 
 2001: The Borussia Legend – The Way Home (about the rise of Borussia Mönchengladbach) (German title: Mythos Borussia – Der Weg nach Hause (über Borussia Mönchengladbach und deren Aufstieg)
 2005: The Prince from Bergheim – The Podolski Phenomenon (German title: Der Prinz aus Bergheim – Das Phänomen Podolski)
 2005: Udo Lattek's 70th Birthday – A Trip Back (German title: 70 Jahre Udo Lattek – Eine Zeitreise)
 2008: Not Seeing, Hearing – Blind soccer players meet Bundesliga professionals (German title: Hören statt Sehen – Blindenfußballer treffen auf Bundesliga-Profis)
 2008: The Michael Jäger Story – From a Hooligan to a TV Star (German title: Die Michael Jäger Story – Vom Hooligan zum Serienstar)
 2008: The Great Taboo – Homosexuality and Football (German title: Das große Tabu – Homosexualität und Fußball)
 2009: Breaking the Taboo – The New Progress of Homosexuality in Football (German title: Tabubruch – Der neue Weg von Homosexualität im Fußball)
 2009: Athlete Drinkers – Alcohol in Football (German title: Der Promille-Profi – Alkohol im Fußball)
 2011: Football is Everything – Even Gay (German title: Fußball ist alles – auch schwul)
 2011: Tom meets Zizou – Not a Midsummer Night's Drea (German title: Tom meets Zizou – Kein Sommermärchen)
 2013: Mesut, 17
 2013: Trainer!
 2018: Being Mario Götze
 2018: Inside Borussia Dortmund
 2020: Like a Stranger - A German Pop Music Story (German title: Wie ein Fremder – Eine deutsche Popmusik-Geschichte)
2022: Art is a State of Mind
2022: Second Move Kills – 5 years with Jens Spahn (German title: Second Move Kills – 5 Jahre mit Jens Spahn)

Awards 
 2008: Felix Rexhausen Prize for The great taboo
 2010: Adolf Grimme Prize for Tabubruch – Breaking the taboo
 2010: Alternative Media Prize for Tabubruch – Breaking the taboo
 2011: Rated "especially worthwhile" for Tom meets Zizou
 2012: VDS Television Prize for Tom meets Zizou
 2013: Best Football Film of all time: Nomination for Tom meets Zizou
 2013: VDS Television Prize for Trainer!
 2014: Adolf Grimme Prize: Nomination for Trainer!
 2018: Rated "worthwhile" for Being Mario Götze
 2019: AIPS – International Sport Media Award: Nomination for Being Mario Götze
2019: Best German Sport Film (Being Mario Götze)
2020: ROMY – Nomination for Inside Borussia Dortmund

Other Engagements 
 Member of the Deutsche Filmakademie.
 Member of the German Academy for Football Culture.
 Cooperation with DFB - Committees fighting discrimination and racism in soccer.
 Co-author of the DFB brochure about Football and Homosexuality.
 Co-author of the book My First Trip to the Stadium.

References

External links 
 
 Website pausefilm
 Website Tom meets Zizou
 Website Trainer!

Living people
Mass media people from Bonn
1972 births